Baggage is a BBC Radio 4 situation comedy which by August 2009 had aired for 4 series, each consisting of 6 30-minute episodes. Series 1 aired from April 2005, Series 2 from July 2006, Series 3 from December 2007 and Series 4 from July 2009.
It starred Hilary Lyon, Phyllis Logan, Adie Allen, and Stuart McQuarrie. It was written by Hilary Lyon and directed by Marilyn Imrie.

Episodes

Series 1
 "Midsummer Mayhem"
 "Festival Flatmates"
 "Halloween Havoc"
 "Fireworks and Funerals"
 "Christmas Crises"
 "New Year, New Life"

Series 2
 "Midsummer Lovesick and Sickening"
 "Procreation and Procrastination"
 "And So to Bath"
 "The Loneliness of the Long Distance Lover"
 "Highland Fling"
 "Perpetual Emotion"

Series 3
 "The Homecoming"
 "Family Matters"
 "The Regeneration Game"
 "Not Quite Part of the Plan"
 "Human Doings"
 "Keep Right on to the End of the Road"

Series 4
 "Ashes to Auld Reekie"
 "Carping Diem"
 "The Father, the Mother, the Dead Friend and Her Lover"
 "Tales of the Unexpected"
 "For a' that and a' that"
 "You're a Long Time Dead"

Notes and references

External links
John. Lavalie Baggage. EpGuides. 21 Jul 2005. 29 Jul 2005

BBC Radio 4 programmes